Syrmatium was a formerly accepted genus of flowering plants in the family Fabaceae (legumes), native to the southwestern United States. , it was considered a synonym of Acmispon by Plants of the World Online, and only Acmispon was recognized by the Jepson eFlora.

Taxonomy
Syrmatium belonged to a group of species traditionally placed in the tribe Loteae of the subfamily Faboideae. The taxonomy of this group is complex, and its division into genera has varied considerably. Many species of Syrmatium were formerly placed in a broadly defined genus Lotus. A molecular phylogenetic study in 2000 based on nuclear ribosomal ITS sequences confirmed the view that the "New World" (American) and "Old World" (African and Eurasian) species of Lotus did not belong in the same genus. Syrmatium was monophyletic.

Species
Species that have been placed in Syrmatium include:

Syrmatium argophyllum (A.Gray) Greene = Acmispon argophyllus (A.Gray) Brouillet
Syrmatium cytisoides (Benth.) Greene = Acmispon cytisoides (Benth.) Brouillet
Syrmatium decumbens (Benth.) Greene = Acmispon decumbens (Benth.) Govaerts
Syrmatium distichum Greene = Acmispon distichus (Greene) BrouilletSyrmatium haydonii (Orcutt) Brand = Acmispon haydonii (Orcutt) BrouilletSyrmatium junceum Benth.) Greene = Acmispon junceus (Benth.) BrouilletSyrmatium leucophyllum (Greene) Brand = Acmispon procumbens (Greene) Brouillet var. procumbens Syrmatium micranthum (Nutt. ex Torr. & A.Gray) Greene = Acmispon micranthus (Nutt. ex Torr. & A.Gray) BrouilletSyrmatium prostratum (Nutt.) Greene = Acmispon prostratus (Nutt.) BrouilletSyrmatium tomentosum (Hook. & Arn.) Vogel = Acmispon tomentosus (Hook. & Arn.) GovaertsSyrmatium veatchii (Greene) Greene = Acmispon dendroideus var. veatchii (Greene) BrouilletSyrmatium watsonii (Vasey & Rose) Brand = Hosackia alamosana'' Rose

References

Faboideae
Historically recognized angiosperm genera
Fabaceae genera